Invasion of the Space Invaders: An Addict's Guide to Battle Tactics, Big Scores and the Best Machines is a 1982 nonfiction book on video games by the British author Martin Amis. The book is both a survey of the 80s New York City arcade scene, and a cheat sheet of gaming tips and tricks. Despite some reportage to the contrary, Amis has not "disowned" the book as has been claimed, despite its great dissimilarity to the rest of the oeuvre. The book's foreword is written by fellow arcade game enthusiast Steven Spielberg. Amis does strike an admonishing tone at times, even going so far as to say that video gaming is "morally ambiguous". The book was written concurrently with Money.

Reviews
Edge

References

1982 non-fiction books
Books about video games